The orange-browed hemispingus (Kleinothraupis calophrys) is a species of bird in the family Thraupidae found in Bolivia and far eastern Peru. Its natural habitat is subtropical or tropical moist montane forests.

References

orange-browed hemispingus
Birds of the Bolivian Andes
orange-browed hemispingus
orange-browed hemispingus
orange-browed hemispingus
Taxonomy articles created by Polbot